The Thomas Jefferson 250th Anniversary silver dollar is a commemorative silver dollar issued by the United States Mint in 1994.

See also
 List of United States commemorative coins and medals (1990s)
 United States commemorative coins

References

1994 establishments in the United States
Modern United States commemorative coins
Thomas Jefferson
United States dollar coins
United States silver coins